Whores (stylized as WHORES.) is an American noise rock band based in Atlanta, Georgia consisting of vocalist and guitarist Christian Lembach, bass guitarist Casey Maxwell and drummer Douglas Jennings Barrett. The band has released two records through Brutal Panda Records and is known for its "intensely cathartic live shows."

History
In 2011, the band released their debut EP, Ruiner through Brutal Panda Records. This was followed by the EP, Clean in 2013, which received attention from music websites such as Pitchfork, Exclaim!, and Sputnikmusic. A split single with the band Rabbits, which consists of The Cure covers, were also released in 2014. On October 28, 2016, they released their new album “Gold“ via eOne Music.

The band has also extensively toured United States, alongside acts such as Red Fang, Melvins, Retox, Torche, The Sword, Black Tusk, Deafheaven, Floor, Kylesa, Obliterations, Iron Reagan, Fight Amp, No Way, Louisiana band CAPRA and Creepoid.

Musical style
The band's music is mainly described as noise rock. Pitchfork Media reviewer Andy O'Connor noted the influences of Melvins, Helmet, Karp, Pissed Jeans, and Amphetamine Reptile Records artists. The band also incorporates  sludge in its sound.

The band also collaborated with many figures of the noise rock scene. The band's first EP was mastered by Harvey Milk drummer Kyle Spence and their sophomore EP was produced by Ryan Boesch, who worked with various acts such as Melvins, Fu Manchu, Helmet and Foo Fighters.

Band members

Current members
 Christian Lembach – vocals, guitar
 Casey Maxwell – bass
 Douglas Jennings Barrett – drums

Former members
 Jake Schultz – bass (former bassist for Norma Jean)
 Steven Higginbottom – bass
 Joel Willis – drums
 Donnie Adkinson – drums
 Travis Owen – drums

Discography
 Studio albums
 Gold. (2016)
EPs
 Ruiner (2011)
 Clean (2013)

Singles
 Split (2014, split single with Rabbits)

References

External links
 

Musical groups established in 2010
American noise rock music groups
American sludge metal musical groups
Rock music groups from Georgia (U.S. state)
Musical groups from Atlanta
American musical trios
Heavy metal musical groups from Georgia (U.S. state)
2010 establishments in Georgia (U.S. state)